Thomas Arthur or Tom Arthur may refer to:

Thomas Arthur (bishop) (died 1486), Roman Catholic bishop of Limerick
Thomas Arthur (physician) (1593–c. 1666), Irish Roman Catholic physician
Thomas Arthur (VC) (1835–1902), recipient of the Victoria Cross
Thomas Arthur (dramatist) (died 1532), English divine and dramatist
Thomas Arthur, comte de Lally (1702–1766), French soldier
Thomas Arthur (Iowa judge) (1860–1925), justice of the Iowa Supreme Court
Thomas Arthur (tailor), Scottish tailor who worked for James V of Scotland
Thomas Arthur (MP), in 1397, MP for Somerset
Tom Arthur (rugby union) (1906–1986), Welsh international rugby union player
Tom Arthur (Australian politician) (1883–1953)
Tom Arthur (Scottish politician) (born 1985), member of Scottish Parliament

See also

Arthur Thomas (disambiguation)